The artistic roller skating events of World Games I were held on July 27–30, 1981, at Cal Skate Roller Rink in Milpitas, California, in the United States. These were the first World Games, an international quadrennial multi-sport event, and were hosted by the city of Santa Clara.

Medalists
Sources:

Details

Men’s singles

Short program

1. Mark Glatz, USA   2. Rick Elsworth, USA   3. Michele Biserni, Italy   4. Paul Irving, Australia   5. Ivan Ragazzi, Italy   6. Pierre Adjoury, Canada   7. James Beaton, England   8. Juan Carlos Hidalgo, Colombia

After free skate

Gold, Mike Glatz, USA.   Silver, Rick Elsworth, USA.   Bronze, Michele Biserni, Italy

Women’s singles

Short program

1. Elene Bonati, Italy   2. Anna Conklin, USA   3. Tina Kneisley, USA   4. Kathleen O’Brien Di Felice, USA   5. Daniela Marinelli, Italy   6. Irene Bates, New Zealand   7. Barbara Pennington, Canada

After free skate

Gold, Anna Conklin, USA.   Silver, Elena Bonati, Italy.   Bronze, Tina Kneisley, USA

Dance couples

Compulsory dances

1. Bill Richardson–Holly Valenti, USA   2. Mark Howard–Cindy Smith, USA   3. Eamon Geoghegan–Kim Geoghegan, Britain   4. Jim Crouch–Sherrie McCumber, Canada   5. Gianni Galetti–Azzurra Nascetti, Spain   6. Gary Irving–Tracy Ferris, Australia

After free dance

Gold, Bill Richardson–Holly Valenti, USA.  Silver, Mark Howard–Cindy Smith, USA.   Bronze, Eamon Geoghegan–Kim Geoghegan, Britain.

Pairs

Short program

1. Paul Price–Tina Kneisley, USA   2. Rick Elsworth–Ann Marie Green, USA   3. Guy Aubin–Sylvia Gingras, Canada   4. Michael Hanrahan–Louise Hawdon, Australia;   Guglielmo Pistocchi–Sylvia Meco, Italy, no placing, Pistocchi fell

After free skate

Gold, Paul Price–Tina Kneisley, USA.   Silver, Rick Elsworth–Ann Marie Green, USA.   Bronze, Guy Aubin–Sylvia Gingras, Canada.

Gallery

References

Artistic roller skating competitions
1981 World Games